Linka may refer to:
Linka (skipper), a genus of butterfly
Lake Linka, a lake in Minnesota
Linn-Kristin Riegelhuth Koren or Linka (born 1984), athlete
Linka (festival), a Tibetan event during which Lhamo is held
Linka (fl. 1571), Pogesanian leader who participated in the Prussian uprisings

People with the name
Jiří Ignác Linek or Jiří Ignác Linka (1725–1791), Czech composer 
Paweł Linka (born 1986), Polish footballer
Alois Linka, runner for Czechoslovakia at the 1924 Summer Olympics
Bernarda Linka, a historical figure documented by Gabriela Dudeková
Peter Linka, actor who portrays Mile Valstoria in the video game Sniper 2
Wendy Linka, former girlfriend and fundraiser for Willie Brown
Línka Gékova Gérgova, a contributor to the music of Bulgaria
Linka Lowczynski, mother of Christine Niederberger
Lesli Linka Glatter (born 1953), actress

Fictional
Linka Karensky, a character played by Elke Sommer in The Wrecking Crew
 Linka, the Soviet Planeteer of wind from Captain Planet and the Planeteers
 Linka Loud, gender-bent dream version of Lincoln from The Loud House

See also
Israel Galerie Linka, a book featuring Yitzhak Frenkel
La Min A Linka A Nyeint, a movie starring Su Shun Lai
Linka Detskej Istoty, the Slovak Republic's UNICEF effort in Missing Children Europe